Johanna Pirker (born June 26, 1988) is an Austrian computer scientist, educator, and game designer at Graz University of Technology with a focus on games research, virtual reality and data science. Pirker was listed on the Forbes 30 under 30 Europe list in the category Science & Healthcare (2018) for her efforts in improving digital education with virtual reality environments and games. She holds a Ph.D. in Computer Science. Her dissertation was supervised by the Austrian e-learning expert Christian Gütl and MIT professor of physics John Winston Belcher. She is involved in various efforts to educate about the potential of video games. This also includes efforts to advocate the background and cultural aspect of video games. In 2020 she received the Käthe-Leichter Prize for her efforts for her initiatives in the field of diversity in engineering and in the games industry. In 2021 she received the Hedy Lamarr Prize.

Awards and prizes 
Pirker received multiple awards including a listing on the Forbes 30 under 30 Europe list for her research and development efforts in the field of virtual reality for learning applications. 
 Forbes 30 under 30 Europe, Science & Healthcare (2018)
 IGDA Women in Games Ambassador, GDC (2017)
 Women in Tech Award by Futurezone (2019)
 Käthe-Leichter-Prize (2020)
 Hedy Lamarr Prize (2021)

References

External links 
 Personal Homepage
 
 

Austrian women computer scientists
1988 births
Living people
Data scientists
Women data scientists
Austrian computer scientists